Markus Flanagan (born August 20, 1964) is an American actor.

Career
In 1990, he starred in the short-lived ABC police drama Sunset Beat alongside George Clooney, Michael Deluise and Erik King.

He was a series regular on NBC's Nurses for season two playing Luke, the rebel nurse. 

Flanagan co-starred in the Nickelodeon series Unfabulous as Jeff Singer, the father of Emma Roberts' character, from 2004 to 2007. His other television credits include CSI: Crime Scene Investigation, CSI: Miami, Judging Amy, Northern Exposure and Friends. He also had a recurring role as Harry Dean on Fox's Melrose Place and is a recurring character on the Peabody award winning show Better Things.

He has appeared in over 125 television episodes with roles on; CSI, CSI Miami, NCIS, Major Crimes, Bones, Agents of Shield, Will & Grace, Seinfeld, Veronica's Closet, and many others.

His film roles include Biloxi Blues directed by Mike Nichols, Blue Steel directed by Kathryn Bigelow, Born on the 4th of July directed by Oliver Stone, The Kingdom directed by Peter Berg among others.

Flanagan studied with Sanford Meisner in the last class taught by Meisner at Neighborhood Playhouse Acting School in New York City.

He is the author of One Less Bitter Actor: An Actor's Survival Guide a staple among actors and required reading in many university theater programs.

Markus created the play series; The LA Cafe Plays. This one-day play format creates 5 one act plays in a single day. The plays are written, rehearsed and performed in the same day. This series has been running monthly for over 13 years in Santa Monica.

References

External links

1964 births
20th-century American male actors
21st-century American male actors
American male film actors
American male television actors
Living people
Male actors from Pennsylvania
Neighborhood Playhouse School of the Theatre alumni
People from Bryn Mawr, Pennsylvania